Thank You, Love may refer to:

 Thank You, Love (Jose Mari Chan album)
 Thank You, Love (Kana Nishino album)